Daniel Collingwood (c. 1634 – 3 April 1681) was an English soldier and politician.

The son of Sir Robert Collingwood of Branton and Margaret Delaval, he was educated at Warkworth and Cambridge, and was commissioned in the Duke of Albemarle's (later, the Queen's) Troop of Life Guards, commanded by Sir Philip Howard, upon its raising in 1661. He was a Member of Parliament (MP) for Berwick-upon-Tweed from 1665 and Morpeth in late 1679, re-elected in 1681. He succeeded his father as governor of Holy Island and Keeper of the Castle of Lindisfarne,

He died in 1681, aged approximately 47, and was buried in Westminster Abbey.

References

1634 births
1681 deaths
Year of birth uncertain
Place of birth missing
People from Morpeth, Northumberland
Military personnel from Northumberland
English MPs 1661–1679
English MPs 1680–1681
English MPs 1681